Magín Díaz y el Sexteto Gamerano is a double album by the Colombian musician and composer Magín Díaz, and the backing band Sexteto Gamerano. The first disc was released on 29 October 2015, and the second on 1 November, both on Bandcamp.

Background
Magín Díaz is a Colombian musician and composer, best known for being the uncredited writer of "Rosa, que linda eres", a song about an unrequited love. Born into poverty, Díaz could not read or write, but was musically talented; the melody of "Rosa" gained popularity and the song was covered by other Colombian artists, it was credited to a distant relative Irene Martínez, for legal reasons. During his life, Díaz spent time in Venezuela to perform with a band and to work on a construction site, but mostly lived in his hometown, Gamero, a small village near San Basilio de Palenque.

In 2015, the manager of Chilean label Konn Recordings (now based in Colombia), Mauricio Sandoval (also known as DJ Subversivo and Mr. Toé), recorded a selection of Díaz's songs for the very first time. The double album, Magín Díaz y el Sexteto Gamerano, was released the same year on Bandcamp. The traditional music is on the first disc, whilst remixes of his songs were on the second, encompassing a wide range of genres such as house, dembow and future bass.

Track listing

Personnel
Adapted from the Bandcamp page.
Magín Díaz – vocalist
Filiberto Arrieta – secondary vocalist and chorus leader
Carlos Torres – alegre drum and chorus
Joaquin García – bass drums
Manuel Martinez – caller
Guillermo Valencia – secondary caller and musical arrangements
Enrique Díaz – guache and chorus
Germán Soto – guacharaca
Jorge Luís Pérez – choirs

Production
Mauricio Sandoval – production
  Diego Angulo – production assistant
Francisco Rojas – traditional disco
Tropikore – disco remixes

References

2015 albums